Helgo Nikolaus Zettervall, older spelling Zetterwall, (21 November 1831  – 17 March 1907) was a Swedish architect and professor of the Royal Swedish Academy of Arts. He is best known for his drastic restorations of churches and other buildings around Sweden. 

Zettervall was a proponent of  Gothic Revival architecture and is most commonly associated with his design of the plans for the extensive restoration of Lund  Cathedral during the late 19th century.

Biography

Zettervall was born at  Lidköping in Västra Götaland County, Sweden. 
He attended the Royal Swedish Academy of Fine Arts where he studied under Fredrik Wilhelm Scholander (1816–1881) and graduated during 1860. In 1862, he conducted a study trip to 
1862 made a trip to Germany, France and Italy. 

He was chief of Board superintendent for the administration of state buildings (Överintendentsämbetet) from 1882–97.  Zettervall was the chief architect in the restoration of old buildings and churches in Sweden during the period 1860–90. Among other commissions,  Zettervall  designed the plans for the renovation of Lund  Cathedral (1860–1902)  and Uppsala Cathedral (1886–1893). He was appointed to several other large scale restorations including Linköping Cathedral (1877–86), Skara Cathedral (1886–94) and Uppsala Cathedral (1885–93), as well as the Kalmar Castle (1886–90).

Oscar Fredrik Church (Oscar Fredriks kyrka)  in Gothenburg  was constructed on the basis of plans drawn by  Helgo Zetterwall. The church was inaugurated on 2 April 1893 and is a prime example of Northern European Gothic Revival architecture. 
Zettervall was the main proponent of  Gothic Revival architecture  of church buildings.  His influence has been criticized for his restoration principles. His restorations were often not intended to bring back old looks, but according to Zettervall to restore them according to the ideals in the style they were originally built in.

Personal life
In 1861, he  married   Ida Anna Christina Lagergren. He was father to architect Folke Zettervall  (1862–1955). 
He became an honorary member  of the Royal Swedish Academy of Letters, History and Antiquities in 1884 and in 1897 was made a member of the Royal Swedish Academy of Sciences.
He died  in Stockholm during 1907 and was buried in the family plot at Norra begravningsplatsen

See also
 Eugène Viollet-le-Duc
 George Gilbert Scott

References

Other sources
Bodin, Anders (2016) Zettervall i Lund : arkitektur och stadsbyggnad i 1800-talet  (Lund: Föreningen Gamla Lund)

External links
https://web.archive.org/web/20130210024129/http://www.byggnadsvard.se/byggnadskultur/zettervalls-villor-och-bost%C3%A4llen
http://130.242.34.243/webarkdok/detalj.asp?id=590 

1831 births
1907 deaths
People from Lidköping Municipality
19th-century Swedish architects
Gothic Revival architects
Members of the Royal Swedish Academy of Sciences
Burials at Norra begravningsplatsen